Kozhnitz is the name of a Hasidic dynasty founded by the Kozhnitzer Maggid, Rebbe Yisroel Hopsztajn. Kozhnitz is the Yiddish name of Kozienice, a town in present-day Poland.

Lineage

Rebbe Yisroel Hopsztajn, the Maggid and founder of the Kozhnitz dynasty, and one of the three "patriarchs" of Polish hasidism, was a disciple of Rebbe Elimelech of Lizhensk (Rabbi Elimelech Lipman of Lizhensk), author of Noam Elimelech. The Rebbe Elimelech was a disciple of the Rebbe Dovber, the Maggid ("preacher") of Mezeritch, the primary disciple of the Baal Shem Tov, the founder of Hasidism.

Kozhnitzer Magid : Yisroel Hopsztajn (c. 1733 – 1814), author of the classic Avodas Yisroel.
Second Kozhnitzer Rebbe : Moshe Elyokim Bri'o Hopsztajn (c. 1757 – 1828)— son of the Avodas Yisroel; rebbe from 1814 to 1828.
Third Kozhnitzer Rebbe : Chayim Myer Yechiel Shapira (1789 – 1849), the Sorof of Moglenitz—grandson of the Avodas Yisroel : rebbe from 1828 to 1849; descendant ben acher ben, from the Megaleh Amukos, son-in-law of R' Elozor of Lizensk (son of the Elimelech of Lizensk). His father, R' Avi Ezri Zelig Shapira was the son-in-law of the Maggid of Kozhnitz.
Rebbe Avi Ezri Zelig Shapira of Moglenitz, son of R Chaim Myer Yechiel, son-in-law of Admor Avrohom Yaakov Friedman, first Sadigura rebbe.
Rebbe Chaim Myer Yechiel Shapira of Drubitch, son of R Avi Ezri Zelig Shapira, son-in-law of Rebbe Yitzchok Friedman of Bohush.
Rebbe Avraham Yaakov Shapira of Drubitch and Jerusalem, Drubitcher Rebbe, son of Rebbe Chaim Myer Yechiel Shapira, son-in-law of Rebbe Nosson Dovid Rabinowicz of Partzov (below).
Fourth Kozhnitzer Rebbe : Elozor Hopsztajn (I) (d. 1861)—son of Moshe Elyokim Bri'o Hopsztajn; rebbe from 1849 to 1861.
Fifth Kozhnitzer Rebbe : Yechiel Yaakov Hopsztajn (1846–1866)—son of Elozor; rebbe from 1863 – 1866.
Rebbe Nosson Dovid Rabinowicz of Paczev, Partzever Rebbe, son-in-law of Rebbe Yechiel Yaakov (and son of the Biala Rebbe, Yitzchok Yaakov Rabinowicz and direct descendant of the Yid / Yehudi HaKadosh)
Sixth Kozhnitzer Rebbe : Yerachmiel Moshe Hopsztajn son of Yechiel Yaakov (1860- 13th of Elul 1909)
Seventh generation of Kozhnitzer Rebbes
Rebbe Aharon Yechiel, son of Rebbe Yerachmiel Moshe (1892- 3rd of Tishre 1942).  He was rebbe around the same time as his brothers.
Rebbe Yisroel Elozor (1889–1966)
Eighth Kozhnitzer Rebbe in Israel :  Moshe Shimshon Sternberg (a grandson of Rebbe Yisroel Elozor Hopsztajn [seventh generation]), one of the last Hasidic rebbes remaining in the mostly secular Tel Aviv. Does outreach (kiruv) work in Tel Aviv; Bnei Brak; Jerusalem; and Upper West Side, Manhattan in New York.
Rebbe Asher Elimelech

Kozhnitz communities in Williamsburg, Borough Park, Monsey and Sea Gate in Brooklyn also have their own rebbes, all descendants of the Maggid.

See also
History of the Jews in Poland

References

External links
 Simchas Beis Sho'eva in Kozhnitz Tel Aviv
Kozhnitz Shteeble

 
Hasidic dynasties of Poland
Orthodox Judaism in Poland